William Gerald Rainbird (9 April 1916 – 27 September 1997) was a New Zealand cricketer who played first-class cricket for Wellington from 1935 to 1946.

Bill Rainbird was a right-handed batsman. He was the second-highest run-scorer in the Plunket Shield in 1938-39, with 280 runs at an average of 56.00, including his only first-class century, 102 against Otago. He was in the New Zealand squad to play the touring Sir Julien Cahn’s XI at the end of the season, in what proved to be New Zealand’s last match before World War II, but he was made twelfth man.

He served in the New Zealand Army during World War II.

References

External links
 
 

1916 births
1997 deaths
Cricketers from Wellington City
New Zealand cricketers
Wellington cricketers